Thomas Logan (17 August 1888 – 21 June 1962) was a Scottish footballer, who played for Falkirk and Chelsea.

Career
Born in Barrhead, Logan began his senior career with local club Arthurlie of Scotland's second tier in 1908, moving to Falkirk, at that time one of the top teams in the country, in 1910, following a trial. During the initial months of his first season at Brockville Park (in which the club eventually finished in third place), his elder brother Alec was a teammate prior to a transfer to England; another older sibling James was also a professional footballer who played in England, becoming an opponent after he moved back home in 1912 to play with Rangers.

With the Bairns, Logan lifted the Scottish Cup after a 2–0 win over Raith Rovers in the 1913 final at Celtic Park, scoring the second goal; it was the club's first major honour, and he joined Chelsea within a few weeks. a year later he was joined at Stamford Bridge by another member of that Falkirk team, Jimmy Croal.

Logan was a member of the Chelsea side that reached the 1915 FA Cup Final. He was one of the few Chelsea players to get a positive mention in the Manchester Guardian report on the final for a few "dashing excursions" into the Sheffield half, he failed to score. By then, he was judged to be "an ideal centre half who showed judgement in his play", although in his early years he had been considered a forward and had a good scoring ratio for Falkirk. He was playing further back when capped by Scotland.

Logan's career was interrupted by World War I, during which he had loan spells back in Scotland (where the domestic league continued, unlike in England) with Partick Thistle, Dunfermline Athletic and back at Falkirk. His military service included the Argyll and Sutherland Highlanders whose regimental team he represented.

He was contracted to Chelsea until July 1922 (although his last appearance for the club was in November 1920) and made a total of 116 appearances scoring 8 goals in total. In his mid-30s, he returned to Arthurlie, then playing in the Western League – a wartime competition which continued for several years due to the slow reorganisation of lower league football in Scotland.

Logan represented Scotland once, appearing in a 1913 British Home Championship match against Ireland while with Falkirk.

Honours
Falkirk
Scottish Cup: 1913

Chelsea
FA Cup: Runner-up 1915

Notes

References

1962 deaths
1888 births
Scottish footballers
Chelsea F.C. players
People from Barrhead
Scotland international footballers
Falkirk F.C. players
Scottish Football League players
English Football League players
British Army personnel of World War I
Argyll and Sutherland Highlanders soldiers
Association football central defenders
Arthurlie F.C. players
Falkirk F.C. wartime guest players
Partick Thistle F.C. wartime guest players
Dunfermline Athletic F.C. wartime guest players
Sportspeople from East Renfrewshire
FA Cup Final players